Barramornie is a locality in the Western Downs Region, Queensland, Australia.

Road infrastructure
The Leichhardt Highway runs along the eastern boundary, while the Condamine Meandarra Road (State Route 74) passes through the north-west corner.

References 

Western Downs Region
Localities in Queensland